Wath railway station was one of three railway stations in Wath-upon-Dearne, South Yorkshire, England.  It was the southern terminus of The Hull & South Yorkshire Extension Railway which became part of the Hull and Barnsley Railway in 1898 and was the southern terminus of a branch line from Wrangbrook Junction. The station was located on Station Road between the Great Central Railway's Wath Central station and the Midland Railway's Wath North station.  Branch line trains connected with Sheffield-Cudworth-Hull trains at Wrangbrook.

However, the line was not a success for passenger traffic: it was closed to passengers on 6 April 1929. The station at Wath was a single platform affair but with a substantial station house. This and the former ticket office are the only surviving remains of the station and have survived the buildings of Wath's other two, more successful stations: they still stand on Station Road, called "Station House" and "Barnsley Cottage" respectively.

References

Disused railway stations in Rotherham
Wath upon Dearne
Former Hull and Barnsley Railway stations
Railway stations in Great Britain opened in 1902
Railway stations in Great Britain closed in 1929